Henry "Trae" Winter (born March 31, 1972) is an American solar physicist currently employed by the Smithsonian Astrophysical Observatory. He has carried out data analysis for the Solar and Heliospheric Observatory, Yohkoh, Hinode, SDO, and TRACE spacecraft, but is especially noted for his extensive science education and outreach activities. Outreach activity includes development of several museum exhibits in the Boston area, and of the "Solar Wall" exhibition at the Smithsonian Air and Space Museum in Washington, D.C.

References

1972 births
Living people
American astrophysicists